Johann Daniel Preissler, or Preisler (1666–1737) was a notable member of a German artistic family, originating in Bohemia. His children included Johann Justin Preissler (1698–1771), Georg Martin Preisler (1700–1754), Barbara Helena Preisler (1707–1758; married to Oeding), Johan Martin Preisler (1715–1794), and Valentin Daniel Preisler (1717–1765), all in their time renowned artists.

Most notable for his portraits, nudes and history paintings, Johann Daniel Preissler also produced drawings and frescoes. He was particularly known beyond his native Nuremberg for his Die durch Theorie erfundene Practic (full title: Die durch Theorie erfundene Practic oder Gründlich verfasste Reguln deren man sich als einer Anleitung zu berühmter Künstlere Zeichen-Wercke bestens bedienen kann), a sequence of works on art theory – the individual works were translated into several other languages and served as textbooks for students such as the Swiss Salomon Gessner right up until the 19th century. By the time of his death in 1737, Johann Caspar Füssli spoke of Preissler and Jan Kupecky as the two most famous Nuremberg artists of the early 18th century.

Life
Preissler was the posthumous son of the history painter and portraitist Daniel Preissler (1627–1665). He got his education in the studio of Johann Murrer. From 1688 to 1696 he stayed in Italy, including periods in Rome and Venice. In 1705 he became the director of Nuremberg's Academy of Fine Arts which under his leadership turned into a city institution. 

In 1716 he founded the Zeichenschule (drawing school), open to "poor people's children" – it proved a great success. With 71 students entering in the first year, its intake was so large that in 1721 Preissler began producing the teaching materials which later became his Die durch Theorie erfundene Practic – he had previously only published academic works, such as ones on anatomy. Preissler also wrote on the academically neglected topics such as ornament and flower-drawing (in 1725) and landscape drawing (1739), though throughout his writing he insisted that these were only beginners' lessons.

According to the Nuernbergisches Gelehrten-Lexicon, he suffered from poor health, which prevented him from achieving all the expectations his great talent allowed. The same article indicates that his five sons were not only excellent artists but fond of music, and to make him happy, they often liked to play a concert for him, in which he occasionally himself participated.

Notes

Bibliography
 (de) Nürnberger Künstlerlexikon. 2007
 (de) Wilhelm Schwemmer: Nürnberger Kunst im 18. Jahrhundert.
 (de) Wolf Eiermann: Die Veröffentlichungen der Nürnberger Mahler-Academie.
 (de) Friedrich Leitschuh: Preisler, Daniel [family article]  In: Allgemeine Deutsche Biographie (ADB). Band 26. Duncker & Humblot, Leipzig 1888, S. 550–552.
(de) Will, Georg Andreas, Nürnbergisches Gelehrten-Lexikon, As supplemented by Christian Conrad Nopitsch (8 volumes), published 1755-1802.

External links

Works on and by Johann Daniel Preissler in the catalogue of the Deutschen Nationalbibliothek
Johann Daniel Preißler at arthistoricum.net 
https://web.archive.org/web/20160304110221/https://portal.d-nb.de/opac.htm?query=Woe%3D116282061&method=simpleSearch
http://www.arthistoricum.net/themen/themenportale/geschichte-der-kunstgeschichte/quellen-zur-geschichte-der-kunstgeschichte-digital/johann-daniel-preissler-1666-1737/

1666 births
1737 deaths
German engravers
17th-century German painters
German male painters
18th-century German painters
18th-century German male artists
Academic staff of the Academy of Fine Arts, Nuremberg